Martin Tétreault (born 1957 in Saint-Jean-Baptiste, Quebec, Canada) is a free improvisation musician and visual artist. Often using the turntable as the basis for his experimental music, he has over 60 releases, featuring him solo or in collaborations with people such as Kevin Drumm and Otomo Yoshihide.

References

Further reading
Fortier, Sylvain. "Finalement, je me suis fait avoir… / Clearly, I’ve been had…: Entrevue avec Martin Tétreault." eContact! 14.3 — Turntablism (January 2013). Montréal: CEC.
Weissenbrunner, Karin. "Experimental Turntablism: Historical overview of experiments with record players / records — or Scratches from Second-Hand Technology." eContact! 14.3 — Turntablism (January 2013). Montréal: CEC.

External links
Martin Tétreault at Discogs
Martin Tétreault on the DAME CD label (Montréal)]

1957 births
Canadian DJs
Musicians from Quebec
French Quebecers
Living people
Free improvisation